Most of the major manufacturers of cast iron cookware in the United States began production in the late 1800s or early 1900s. Cast-iron cookware and stoves were especially popular among homemakers and housekeepers during the first half of the 20th century. Most American households had at least one cast-iron stove and cooking pan, and such brands as Griswold and Wagner Ware were especially popular; though several other manufacturers also produced kitchen utensils and cooking pots and pans at that time.

With the exception of Lodge Manufacturing, most American manufacturers of cast iron from this era, such as Atlanta Stove Works, have been acquired by other corporations and no longer produce cast iron cookware in the United States; however, cast iron pots and pans from the early 20th century continue to see daily use among many households in the present day. They are also highly sought after by antique collectors and dealers. Among the rarest products were those produced in 1920. Exporting and trade flourished creating a shortage for U.S. consumers. Exporting overseas created an increase in industry output for the following years. Manufacturing and industry contributed to the prosperity and growth of an era that would be known as the "Roaring 20's" marking a post-war national lifestyle change.

Griswold 

Founded in 1865 as the Seldon and Griswold Manufacturing Company, the Griswold company became known as the premier manufacturer of high-quality cast-iron kitchen items in the United States. The Griswold cast iron foundry was based in Erie, Pennsylvania; and until the early 1900s, cast-iron items from this company were marked with an "ERIE" logo. In the early 1900s, this was changed to a "GRISWOLD" logo, and it is this logo that is most commonly associated with Griswold cast-iron cookware.

Griswold filed for bankruptcy in 1957, and the company was acquired by Randall Corporation, who had also acquired Griswold's rival Wagner Ware in 1952.  Randall sold both Wagner and Griswold to the General Housewares corporation in 1969, and they were the producers of these brands through the 1970s, 1980s, and 1990s. These brands were acquired by the American Culinary Corporation of Willoughby, Ohio, in 2000 when WagnerWare Corp. ceased operations in Sidney, Ohio.

Vollrath 

The Vollrath Company was founded in 1874 in Sheboygan, Wisconsin, by Jacob J. Vollrath. The company manufactured porcelain enameled pots, pans, plates, cups and other kitchenware by coating cast iron with ceramic glaze, and Vollrath received a patent on "speckled" enameled glaze for household utensils in 1889. By the 1920s the Vollrath Company was producing a catalog of more than 800 products. It was affected by the Great Depression, and during World War II the company had moved exclusively into defense manufacturing and thus, production of cast-iron products for household use ceased during this era. Vollrath produced a Polio-Pak during the polio epidemic. It was among the first manufacturing companies in America to integrate computer technology.

Wagner Ware 
Founded in 1881 in Sidney, Ohio, as the Wagner Manufacturing Company, it manufactured metal castings of light hardware for general stores and tin hollowware for government contract work. In 1891, their cast iron foundry went into operation, and it continued producing cast-iron cookware for over a century before closing in 1999. Wagner was acquired by the Randall Corporation in 1952, five years before the same company also purchased Griswold.

After Wagner and Griswold were brought under the Randall Company, the Erie cast iron foundry was closed, and all cast-iron items produced by the company were manufactured in Wagner's Ohio location. Wagner Ware cooking items continued to be produced from the 1960s through the 1990s.

In 2000, both the Griswold and Wagner brands were acquired by the American Culinary Corporation of Willoughby, Ohio. The company continues to promote and produce Wagner products, under the Wagner and Griswold brands; however, new Wagner cast iron has not been produced since the Sidney foundry was closed in 1999.

Favorite 

In 1887, the Favorite Stove & Range Company moved to Piqua, Ohio, from Cincinnati, Ohio. The firm became Piqua's largest manufacturer.  The company focused primarily on the manufacture of stoves and stove parts throughout its history, though it also produced several lines of mid-priced cast-iron pans from the 1910s through the 1930s. The death of owner Stanhope Boal in 1933 and the devastation of the Great Depression led to the company's liquidation in 1935.

Atlanta Stove Works 

The Atlanta Stove Works company was founded in 1889 (originally named Georgia Stove Company) to produce cast-iron stoves. Initially, their business boomed to the point where in 1902, a separate foundry was built in Birmingham, Alabama, especially for the production of hollow ware and cast-iron cookware to supplement their stoves. This separate foundry was named "Birmingham Stove & Range". From the early 1900s through the 1970s, Birmingham Stove & Range foundry produced a line of cast-iron pans that are described as "unmarked" as they had no manufacturer logo or other identifying mark. These "unmarked" cast-iron skillets and pans from Birmingham Stove & Range are widely available and used on a daily basis, even in the present day. Birmingham Stove & Range filed for bankruptcy in 1989, and their holdings were acquired by Lodge Manufacturing.

Lodge 

Founded in 1896 by Joseph Lodge, Lodge Manufacturing is one of America's oldest cookware companies in continuous operation. It is still owned and managed by the descendants of the Lodge family. Most cast iron sold by Lodge is produced in its foundry in South Pittsburg, Tennessee, which has been in operation since the company was founded.

Wapak 

Founded in 1903, the Wapak Hollow Ware company was named after its hometown of Wapakoneta, Ohio, where it produced several lines of "thin wall" (lightweight manufacture) cast-iron skillets. Information about this company is scarce but bankruptcy in 1926 is the reason listed in the Auglaize County records for Wapak's disappearance.

The company utilized several different logos on its wares while in business. One of the company's more famous logos is the "Indian Head" logo which reads: "WAPAK HIGH GRADE HOLLOW WARE". The words are placed inside a circle with a bust of an American Indian chief in full headgear. Pieces bearing this "Indian logo" are the most prized by collectors of Wapak Hollow Ware today.

Borough Furnace 
Founded in 2011, Borough Furnace is based in Syracuse, NY. All of their products are designed by John Truex. Borough Furnace seasons their products with flax seed oil and advertises their usage of recycled materials.

FINEX Cast Iron Cookware Company 

Founded in 2012, FINEX is based in Portland, Oregon, and manufactures cast-iron cookware in the US. The company introduced several new concepts through a successful KickStarter Campaign in 2013. In August 2019, Lodge announced acquisition of FINEX.

Smithey Ironware Company 
Founded in 2015, the Smithey Ironware Company manufactures cast-iron skillets (10-inch and 12-inch) in Charleston, South Carolina.

Butter Pat Industries 

Founded in 2013, Butter Pat Industries manufactures smooth cast-iron skillets, without machining, milling or grinding in Easton, Maryland.

Challenger Breadware 
Founded in 2016, Challenger Breadware's upside-down Dutch ovens are manufactured in Wisconsin and are designed for baking bread in a home oven.

Modern-day importers 
Several companies import cast-iron cookware of Chinese manufacture and market these products in America. Known American marketers of Chinese cast-iron cooking equipment include Bayou Classic, Camp Chef, Coleman, Lodge enameled pans, Old Mountain, The Windmill Cast Iron and Texsport.

See also
 List of cooking vessels

References

External links 
 Wagner and Griswold Society – Association of hobbyists and antique collectors specializing in cast-iron cookware
 Birmingham Stove & Range – Information on cast iron from Atlanta Stove Works, still used and sold (by antique dealers) across the country today
 The Wagner's 1891 Original Cast Iron Skillet – A page with information on the last line of cast-iron pans produced by Wagner in the 1990s (often mistaken by dealers and collectors as vintage 19th-century cast iron)

Kitchenware brands
Cast iron